The thorax is the human chest, or division of an animal's body that lies between the head and the abdomen.

Thorax may also refer to:
The thorax in arthropods, see Thorax (arthropod anatomy)
Thorax (θώραξ), the Ancient Greek term for cuirass/breastplate
Linothorax, Ancient Greek armour composed of linen 
Thorakitai, Hellenistic soldiers equipped with mail
Thorax porcellana, a species of cockroach

People
Thorax of Larissa, an ancient Greek noble of the 5th century BC
Thorax of Lacedaemonia, a Lacedaemonian commander of the late 5th/early 4th century BC
Thorax, who commissioned the 10th Pythian Ode of Pindar, in which the names of Thorax and his lover Hippocleas are immortalized

Journal
Thorax (journal). medical journal

Geography
Thorax (Aetolia), a town of ancient Aetolia, Greece